

Songwriting and production credits

Remixes

2002
 Kylie Minogue – "Love at First Sight" (Dancefloor Killa Mix)
 Cassius featuring Steve Edwards – "The Sound of Violence" (Dancefloor Killa Remix)

2003
 Geyster – "Bye Bye Superman" (Dancefloor Killa Remix)
 Saffron Hill – "My Love Is Always" (David Guetta Dancefloor Killa Vocal Mix)

2005
 Eurythmics – "I've Got a Life" (David Guetta & Joachim Garraud Remix)
 Africanism All Stars featuring Ben Onono – "Summer Moon" (F*** Me I'm Famous Mix)
 Culture Club – "Miss Me Blind" (F*** Me I'm Famous Remix)
 Deep Dish – "Flashdance" (Guetta & Garraud F*** Me I'm Famous Remix)
 Juliet – "Avalon" (F*** Me I'm Famous Remix)

2006
 Bob Sinclar featuring Steve Edwards – "World, Hold On (Children of the Sky)" (David Guetta & Joachim Garraud Remix)
 Benny Benassi – "Who's Your Daddy?" (David Guetta & Joachim Garraud Remix)
 Steve Bug – "At the Moment" (David Guetta Remix)

2007
 Kylie Minogue – "Wow" (Fuck Me I'm Famous Remix)
 David Guetta featuring Cozi – "Baby When the Light" (David Guetta & Fred Rister Remix)

2008
 Sharam featuring Daniel Bedingfield – "The One" (Joachim Garraud & David Guetta Remix)

2009
 The Black Eyed Peas – "Boom Boom Guetta" (David Guetta's Electro Hop Remix)
 The Black Eyed Peas – "I Gotta Feeling" (David Guetta's FMIF Remix)
 Calvin Harris – "Flashback" (David Guetta One Love Remix)
 David Guetta featuring Kid Cudi – "Memories" (Fuck Me I'm Famous Remix)
 Madonna – "Revolver" (Madonna vs. David Guetta One Love Remix) (Madonna vs. David Guetta One Love Version) [featuring Lil Wayne]

2010
 Kelis – "Acapella" (David Guetta Extended Mix)
 Kelly Rowland featuring David Guetta – "Commander" (David Guetta Remix)
 Robbie Rivera – "Rock the Disco" (David Guetta Laptop Remix)
 Flo Rida featuring David Guetta – "Club Can't Handle Me" (David Guetta FMIF Remix)
 David Guetta featuring Rihanna – "Who's That Chick?" (FMIF Remix)

2012
 David Guetta featuring Nicki Minaj – "Turn Me On" (David Guetta & Laidback Luke Remix)
 David Guetta featuring Chris Brown and Lil Wayne – "I Can Only Imagine" (David Guetta & Daddy's Groove Remix)
 Daddy's Groove – "Turn The Lights Down" (David Guetta Re Work)

2013
 Armin van Buuren featuring Trevor Guthrie – "This Is What It Feels Like" (David Guetta Remix)
 Empire of the Sun – "Alive" (David Guetta Remix)
 Passenger – "Let Her Go" (David Guetta Remix)

2014
 Avicii – "Addicted To You" (David Guetta Remix)
 Afrojack featuring Wrabel – "Ten Feet Tall" (David Guetta Remix)
 David Guetta featuring Sam Martin – "Dangerous" (David Guetta Banging Remix)

2016
 Fat Joe and Remy Ma featuring French Montana & Infrared – "All the Way Up" (David Guetta and GLOWINTHEDARK Remix)
 Steve Aoki featuring Rich The Kid & ILoveMakonnen – "How Else" (David Guetta Remix)

2017
 Charlie Puth – "Attention" (David Guetta Remix)

2018
 David Guetta & Sia – "Flames" (David Guetta Remix)
 MC Fioti, J Balvin & Stefflon Don – "Bum Bum Tam Tam" (David Guetta Remix)
 David Guetta featuring Anne-Marie – "Don't Leave Me Alone" (David Guetta Remix)
 Martin Garrix featuring Khalid – "Ocean" (David Guetta Remix)
 David Guetta featuring Chris Willis – "Just a Little More Love" (Jack Back 2018 Remix)
 Lenny Kravitz – "Low" (David Guetta Remix)
 Fred Rister featuring Sam Martin & Chris Willis – "I Want A Miracle" (David Guetta Remix)
 Calvin Harris & Sam Smith – "Promises" (David Guetta Remix)
 Black Coffee & David Guetta featuring Delilah Montagu – "Drive" (David Guetta Remix)

2019
 Bebe Rexha – "Last Hurrah" (David Guetta Remix)
 David Guetta featuring Raye – "Stay (Don't Go Away)" (David Guetta & R3HAB Remix)
 Avicii – "Heaven" (David Guetta & MORTEN Remix)
 David Guetta & Martin Solveig – "Thing for You" (David Guetta Remix)
 David Guetta & Martin Solveig – "Thing for You" (Jack Back Remix)

2021
 David Guetta feat Kid Cudi – "Memories" (2021 Remix)
 Jason Derulo feat Adam Levine – "Lifestyle" (David Guetta Slap House Mix)
 Bad Bunny and Jhay Cortez – "Dakiti" (David Guetta Remix)
 Becky Hill & David Guetta – "Remember" (David Guetta VIP Remix)
 Shouse – "Love Tonight" (David Guetta Remix)
 David Guetta feat Sia – "Titanium" (David Guetta & Morten Future Rave Mix)
 Farruko – "Pepas" (David Guetta Remix)
 Coldplay X BTS – "My Universe" (David Guetta Remix)

2022
 Kavinsky – "Cameo" (David Guetta Remix)

Unreleased tracks
David Guetta, Afrojack and Avicii featuring Amanda Wilson "Before I Could Say Goodbye"

Notes 
 The song was dubbed "Before I Could Say Goodbye" by fans but Guetta did not disclose a name for the song. The song was played at an Avicii tribute concert and was confirmed to be produced by Guetta, Afrojack and Avicii with vocals from British singer Amanda Wilson. At the time of the concert in 2019, Guetta said that the collaboration was previously unreleased and would likely not be released.

References

External links
 
 
 
 

Production discographies
Electronic music discographies